Jean Marco Toualy Dié (born 26 February 1999) is an Ivorian footballer who plays as a winger for Spanish side Almería B.

Club career
On 13 July 2018, after spending three weeks on trial, Toualy signed a three-year contract with Belgian Pro League side Kortrijk joining from Salitas. He made his debut for the club on 14 May 2019, coming on as a second-half substitute for Imoh Ezekiel in a 2–0 away loss against Union Saint-Gilloise.

On 30 December 2019, Toualy agreed to a deal with Spanish side UD Almería, after a trial period; he was initially assigned to the B-team in Tercera División.

Career statistics

Club

Notes

References

External links

1999 births
Living people
Ivorian footballers
Association football wingers
Belgian Pro League players
K.V. Kortrijk players
Tercera División players
UD Almería B players
Ivorian expatriate footballers
Ivorian expatriate sportspeople in Burkina Faso
Ivorian expatriate sportspeople in Belgium
Ivorian expatriate sportspeople in Spain
Expatriate footballers in Burkina Faso
Expatriate footballers in Belgium
Expatriate footballers in Spain